Anaconda is a steel roller coaster located at Kings Dominion, in the Jungle X-Pedition section of the park. Built by Arrow Dynamics and designed by Ron Toomer, Anaconda opened in 1991 as the first looping roller coaster to feature an underwater tunnel and the first at Kings Dominion with more than one inversion.

History

Details about a new roller coaster called Anaconda, set to debut in 1991, were reported in September 1990. The park's Lake Charles was chosen as the site for Anaconda. Arrow Dynamics would design the coaster to incorporate an underwater tunnel as well as keeping the majority of the ride over water. Construction began towards the end of the 1990 park season with elements of the lift hill constructed over the former site of King Kobra, a weight drop Anton Schwarzkopf Shuttle Loop removed in 1987.  Anaconda opened to the public on March 23, 1991.

Ride experience
The train leaves the station climbing the  lift hill.  From there riders plunge  twisting to the right passing an on-ride camera, which has been removed, and entering a  underwater tunnel. The train exits the tunnel, entering a  vertical loop followed by a  sidewinder inversion (a half loop that uses a corkscrew at the top to change direction). After a small hill, the train enters the first brake run nearly slowing to a complete stop.

The second part of the ride begins with a butterfly figure-eight element consisting of sharp twists and turns. The last turn to the right transitions the train into a  double corkscrew above the water. Immediately following is a small bunny hill with a short dive under the lift hill that turns to the left into the final brake run. After a U-turn, the train returns to the station.

References

External links
Official Anaconda page

Roller coasters in Virginia
Roller coasters introduced in 1991
Kings Dominion
Roller coasters operated by Cedar Fair
1991 establishments in Virginia